In video games, the term destructible environment, or deformable terrain, refers to an environment within a game which can be wholly or partially destroyed by the player. It may refer to any part of the environment, including terrain, buildings and other man-made structures. A game may feature destructible environments to demonstrate its graphical prowess, underscore the potency of the player character's given abilities, and/or require the player to leverage them to solve problems or discover new paths and/or secrets.

Early examples include the Taito shooter games Gun Fight (1975) and Space Invaders (1978), where the players could take cover behind destructible objects. An early example of a fully destructible environment can be found in Namco's 1982 game Dig Dug, in which the whole of each level is destructible, though enemies can usually only follow the player through a combination of pre-made tracks and paths made by the player. A similar game released that same year was Mr. Do! by Universal. In most games that feature destructible terrain, it is more common for only part of the environment to be destructible to prevent players from cutting their way directly to the goal.

An early example of a shooter game that featured fully destructible environments was Kagirinaki Tatakai, an early run and gun shooter developed by Hiroshi Ishikawa for the Sharp X1 computer and released by Enix in 1983. The Worms series, starting in 1995, also features terrain which can be completely obliterated.

The earliest first-person shooter example may be Ghen War, released in 1995 for the Sega Saturn, which featured a 3D terrain map generator that allows fully destructible environments. However, the trend to make more and more items and environmental features destroyable by the player hearkens all the way back to the explosive barrels in Doom (1993). Games like Blood II: The Chosen (1998) also featured large numbers of destroyable objects; in that game a room filled with objects could be turned into an empty room filled only with debris.

Newer iterations of this feature can be observed in games such as Dragon Ball Z: Budokai Tenkaichi and Dragon Ball: Xenoverse, where the fighters' dashes and super moves can destroy large rock formations and buildings, Spring,  Crysis (CryEngine 2), Mercenaries 2: World in Flames, Battlefield: Bad Company (Frostbite 1.0), Battlefield: Bad Company 2 (Frostbite 1.5), Battlefield 1943 (Frostbite 1.5), Black, and Red Faction: Guerilla (Geo-Mod). Future implementations are core facets of gameplay and can be found in Battlefield 3 (Frostbite 2), Diablo 3, Battlefield 4 and Battlefield 1 (Frostbite 3), and Tom Clancy's Rainbow Six Siege (AnvilNext 2.0).

See also 
Deformable body
Dynamic Terrain
Terrain rendering

References 

Video game design